The 2012 Pan American Judo Championships was held in Montreal, Canada from April 27–29, 2012.

Medal table

Men's events

Women's events

References

Live results from Judo-World
International Judo Federation
Brazilian Judo Federation

External links
 

American Championships
2012 in Canadian sports
2012
Judo competitions in Canada
International sports competitions hosted by Canada